Kinesin family member 25 (KIF25), also known as kinesin-14, is a human protein encoded by the KIF25 gene. It is part of the kinesin family of motor proteins.

Function 
KIF25 is a minus-end directed microtubule motor protein, and its activity delays the separation of chromosomes during mitosis.

References